Brooklyn Township is one of twenty-two townships in Lee County, Illinois, USA.  As of the 2010 census, its population was 793 and it contained 358 housing units.  In September 1858, Reynolds Township was formed from part of Brooklyn Township.

Geography

Cities, towns, villages
 Compton
 West Brooklyn

Unincorporated towns
 The Burg at 
(This list is based on USGS data and may include former settlements.)

Extinct towns
 Melugin Grove at 
(This town is listed as "historical" by the USGS.)

Cemeteries
The township contains these four cemeteries: Brooklyn, Brooklyn Lutheran, Saint Mary's and Union.

Airports and landing strips
 Earl Barnickel Airport
 Gehant Airport
 W Davis Airport

Demographics

School districts
 Lee Center Community Unit School District 271

Political districts
 Illinois's 14th congressional district
 State House District 90
 State Senate District 45

References
 
 United States Census Bureau 2009 TIGER/Line Shapefiles
 United States National Atlas

External links
 City-Data.com
 Illinois State Archives
 Township Officials of Illinois

Townships in Lee County, Illinois
1849 establishments in Illinois
Townships in Illinois